Oneida Creek is a small river in New York in the United States.  The creek enters the southeastern corner of Oneida Lake at a location known as South Bay, a bay of the lake.  The name is derived from the Oneida tribe of the Iroquois. Stockbridge Falls is located on Oneida Creek.

Course
Oneida Creek rises in the Town of Smithfield.  The cities of Oneida and Sherrill are located along the lower part of the creek. The creek forms part of the boundary between Madison and Oneida counties before entering Oneida Lake near the community of South Bay in the Town of Lenox, located just south of the mouth of the creek. Verona Beach State Park is located north of the mouth.

Hydrology

History
The region of the river is known for the historic Oneida Community of the 19th century.  In the past the Erie Canal was closely associated with the creek prior to the canal being moved farther north.

See also
List of rivers in New York

References

Rivers of New York (state)
Rivers of Madison County, New York
Rivers of Oneida County, New York